Nostradamus was a 16th-century French apothecary and reputed seer famous for his prophecies.

Nostradamus or Nostradamos may also refer to:

Music
 Nostradamos (band), Greek pop group
 Nostradamus (album), a 2008 album by Judas Priest
 Nikolo Kotzev's Nostradamus, a 2001 rock opera
 "Nostradamus", a 1973 song by Al Stewart from Past, Present and Future

Other uses
 Nostradamus (1925 film), an Italian silent film
 Nostradamus (1994 film), a film about Nostradamus' life
 Nostradamus (2000 film) starring Rob Estes
 Nostradamus (video game), a 1993 arcade game
 Gegenes nostradamus, a species of butterfly
 NOSTRADAMUS, a French over-the-horizon radar system

See also
 Nastradamus, a 1999 album by Nas
 "Nastradamus" (song), a song on the album